Francis Washburn (–1865) was an officer in the Union Army during the American Civil War.

Life 
Francis Washburn was born in Massachusetts, about 1838. He was commissioned a second lieutenant in the 1st Massachusetts Cavalry on December 26, 1861; first lieutenant on March 7, 1862; captain of the 2nd Massachusetts Cavalry on January 26, 1863; lieutenant colonel of the 4th Massachusetts Cavalry on February 4, 1864; colonel on February 25, 1865; and finally, brevet brigadier general of volunteers on April 6, 1865, for gallantry and meritorious service at the Battle of High Bridge, Virginia, where he was wounded, and of which he died on April 22, 1865.

Ranks 

 Colonel, USV
 Brigadier general, USV (April 6, 1865)

Notes

References

Sources 

 Heitman, Francis B. (1903). "Washburn, Francis". Historical Register and Dictionary of the United States Army, From Its Organization, September 29, 1789, to March 2, 1903. Vol. 1. Washington, D.C.: Government Printing Office. p. 1004.

Further reading 
 Bouvé, Edward T. (1900). "The Battle at High Bridge". Civil War Papers, Read before the Commandery of the State of Massachusetts, Military Order of the Loyal Legion of the United States. Vol. 2. Boston: F. H. Gilson Company. pp. 403–412.
 Humphreys, Charles A. (1918). Field, Camp, Hospital and Prison in the Civil War, 1863–1865. Boston: Geo. H. Ellis Co. pp. 274–276, 378, 390. 
 O'Reilly, Bill; Dugard, Martin (2011). Killing Lincoln: The Shocking Assassination That Changed America Forever. New York: Henry Holt and Company. pp. 57–62.
 Sorenson, Michael K. "Bvt. Brigadier General Francis Washburn". The Second Mass and Its Fighting Californians. Retrieved May 29, 2022.
 "Francis Washburn". MHS Collections Online. Massachusetts Historical Society. Retrieved May 29, 2022.
 "Personal Items". The New England Farmer. Saturday, April 29, 1865. p. 3.

External links 

 Stoler, Mark (April 6, 2015). "Washburn's Last Charge". Things Have Changed. Blogger. Retrieved May 29, 2022.
 "Francis Washburn". American Civil War Research Database. Historical Data Systems, Inc. Retrieved May 29, 2022.
 "Francis Washburn (1838-1865)". Find a Grave. Ancestry.com. February 2, 2014. Retrieved May 29, 2022.

Union Army generals
1865 deaths
1830s births